Gustavia foliosa is a species of woody plant in the family Lecythidaceae. It is found in Colombia and Ecuador.

References

foliosa
Flora of Colombia
Flora of Ecuador
Vulnerable plants
Taxonomy articles created by Polbot